Paul Simon is an American singer-songwriter who is possibly best known as a member of the folk-duo Simon & Garfunkel with Art Garfunkel. He has released studio albums, live albums, compilation albums and singles. His music career has spanned over 50 years. He started recording music in the 1950s and his most recent album, In the Blue Light, was released on September 7, 2018.

From a time period from 1991 to 2016 Simon has sold 7 million albums in US according to Nielsen.

Albums

Studio albums

Live albums

Compilations
{| class="wikitable plainrowheaders" style="text-align:center;" border="1"
|+ List of compilation albums, with selected chart positions and certifications
! scope="col" rowspan="2" | Year
! scope="col" rowspan="2" | Album details
! scope="col" colspan="10" | Peak chart positions
! scope="col" rowspan="2" style="width:12em;"| Certifications
|-
! scope="col" style="width:2em;font-size:90%;" | US
! scope="col" style="width:2em;font-size:90%;" | AUS
! scope="col" style="width:2em;font-size:90%;" | FIN
! scope="col" style="width:2em;font-size:90%;" | GER
! scope="col" style="width:2em;font-size:90%;" | NLD
! scope="col" style="width:2em;font-size:90%;" | NZ
! scope="col" style="width:2em;font-size:90%;" | NOR
! scope="col" style="width:2em;font-size:90%;" | SWE
! scope="col" style="width:2em;font-size:90%;" | SWI
! scope="col" style="width:2em;font-size:90%;" | UK
|-
| align="center"| 1977
! scope="row" | Greatest Hits, Etc.
 Released: November 1977
 Label: Columbia
| 18 || 22 || — || — || — || 16 || — || — || — || 6
|
RIAA: Platinum
BPI: Gold
MC: Platinum
|-
| align="center"| 1988
! scope="row" | Negotiations and Love Songs
 Released: October 18, 1988
 Label: Warner Bros.
| 110 || 27 || — || — || — || 5 || — || — || — || 17
|
RIAA: Platinum
BPI: Platinum
|-
| align="center"| 1991
! scope="row" | Born at the Right Time: The Best of Paul Simon
 Released: 1991
 Label: Warner Bros.
| — || 20 || — || — || — || 47 || — || — || — || —
|
|-
| align="center"| 1993
! scope="row" | The Paul Simon Anthology
 Released: 1993
 Label: Warner Bros.
| — || 14 || — || — || — || 6 || — || — || — || —
|
ARIA: Platinum
BPI: Silver
|-
| align="center"| 2000
! scope="row" | Greatest Hits: Shining Like a National Guitar
 Released: May 8, 2000
 Label: Warner Bros.
| 108 || 44 || 25 || 59 || 12 || 30 || 5 || 14 || 23 || 6
|
BPI: Gold
ARIA: Platinum
MC: Gold
|-
| align="center"| 2002
! scope="row" | The Paul Simon Collection: On My Way,Don't Know Where I'm Goin Released: November 5, 2002
 Label: Warner Bros.
| 108 || — || — || 71 || — || — || — || 22 || — || —
|
|-
| align="center"| 2006
! scope="row" | Recorded as Jerry Landis
 Released: July 20, 2006
 Label: Laserlight
| — || — || — || — || — || — || — || — || — || —
|
|-
| align="center"| 2007
! scope="row" | The Essential Paul Simon
 Released: June 26, 2007
 Label: Warner Bros.
| 42 || — || — || — || 26 || 29 || — || — || — || 12
|
|-
| align="center"| 2009
! scope="row" | This Better Be Good
 Released: June 1, 2009
 Label: Rhino Custom Products/Starbucks Entertainment
| 60 || — || — || — || — || — || — || — || — || —
|
|-
| align="center"| 2011
! scope="row" | Songwriter
 Released: October 24, 2011
 Label: Sony
| 141 || — || — || — || — || — || — || — || — || —
|
|-
| align="center"| 2015
! scope="row" | The Ultimate Collection
 Released: April 12, 2015
 Label: Sony
| — || 38 || — || — || — || 9 || — || — || — || 1
|
BPI: Platinum
|-
| colspan="20" style="font-size:90%" | "—" denotes a recording that did not chart or was not released in that territory.
|}

Box sets

Singles
NB: This discography does not include singles released under the pseudonym "Tom & Jerry" with Art Garfunkel or singles released by Simon & Garfunkel

Singles recorded under pseudonyms

Notes
A  as True Taylor
B  as Jerry Landis
C  as a member of The Mystics
D  as a member of Tico & The Triumphs
E  as Paul Kane

Solo singles

Notes
A ^ Released only in the UK as CBS 201797
B ^ Only the B-Side 'Run That Body Down' charted in Australia.
C ^ A-side with the Dixie Hummingbirds
D ^ A-side with the Oak Ridge Boys
E ^ Also charted at #24 on the Modern Rock Tracks chart.
F ^ Charted at #4 on the Adult Alternative Songs chart.
G ^ Charted at #14 on the Adult Alternative Songs chart.

 Other appearances 

 Studio 

 Live 

 Guest 

 Videography Source:'''

 1977 The Paul Simon Special (TV, bootleg DVD)
 1981 Paul Simon in Concert (VHS, Laserdisc; DVD 2003, 2008)
 1987 Graceland: The African Concert (VHS, Laserdisc; DVD 1999)
 1987 The All-Star Gospel Session (VHS, bootleg DVD)
 1991 Paul Simon's Concert in the Park (VHS, Laserdisc; DVD 2018)
 2000 You're the One—In Concert (DVD)
 2009 Paul Simon and Friends: The Library of Congress Gershwin Prize for Popular Song (DVD, Blu-ray)
 2011 So Beautiful or So What (Deluxe Limited Edition) (CD/DVD)
 2012 Live in New York City (DVD, Blu-ray)
 2017 The Concert in Hyde Park'' (DVD, Blu-ray)

References

Discographies of American artists
Folk music discographies
Rock music discographies
Discography